Abhimanyusingh Rajput (born 9 May 1998) is an Indian cricketer. He made his List A debut on 7 October 2019, for Baroda in the 2019–20 Vijay Hazare Trophy. He made his first-class debut on 9 December 2019, for Baroda in the 2019–20 Ranji Trophy. He made his Twenty20 debut on 10 January 2021, for Baroda in the 2020–21 Syed Mushtaq Ali Trophy.

References

External links
 

1998 births
Living people
Indian cricketers
Baroda cricketers
Place of birth missing (living people)